The 1985 PBA Open Conference Finals was the best-of-7 basketball championship series of the 1985 PBA Open Conference, and the conclusion of the conference playoffs. The Great Taste Coffee Makers and Magnolia Ice Cream Makers played for the 30th championship contested by the league.

The Great Taste Coffee Makers captured their third straight PBA title with a 4–2 series win against Magnolia Ice Cream.

Qualification

Series scoring summary

Games summary

Game 1

Great Taste were only up by five points at halftime, 49–44, Ricardo Brown got the Coffee Makers to a 6–0 start in the opening minutes of the third period, by the end of the quarter, the Coffee Makers erected a 21-point lead at 86–65. Magnolia were able to narrowed down the gap with barely three minutes remaining in the game when Great Taste coach Baby Dalupan pulled out his starters with the Coffee Makers still enjoying a 19-point bubble, a finishing 11–2 run by the Ice Cream Makers in the last 60 seconds made their defeat a more respectable tally.

Game 2

From an 81-all deadlock with 9:41 to go in the final period, Norman Black scored five straight points that started several eight-point margins by Magnolia, just before the last two minutes of the ballgame, the Coffee Makers were able to close within 98–101, on Willie Pearson's jumper. Biboy Ravanes scored the last 11 points for Magnolia, six of which from the foul line during the final 56 seconds.

Game 3

Marte Saldaña racked up seven consecutive points at the start of the fourth period to spark a Magnolia rally, the game remain close until the last five minutes, Abe King scored on a follow-up which gave the Coffee Makers a 100–93 lead for good.

Game 4

Magnolia established their biggest lead of 13 points at 58–45, early in the third period, Great Taste rallied to within two points, 72–74, after three quarters, the Coffee Makers grab the lead twice in the fourth period, the last at 83–82 with 6:51 left. Magnolia simply wouldn't buckle under pressure, Rudy Distrito hit a triple and Noli Banate converted on the assist by Joey Loyzaga to give the Ice Cream Makers more breathing room, Magnolia went ahead by eight points, 95–87, with two minutes remaining, and just when they had the game in the bag, the Coffee Makers answered with Joel Banal hitting a three-pointer, Ricardo Brown converting two free throws and Joe Binion's split charities makes it 95–93 for Magnolia with 1:09 left, Dante Gonzalgo of Magnolia missed a jumper with 22 seconds to go but they prevent Great Taste from making a field goal by fouling and the Ice Cream Makers not yet in penalty situation, Ricardo Brown missed his final attempt and Biboy Ravanes came down with the rebound at the buzzer.

Game 5

Great Taste took an early 21-point lead in the first quarter, 32–11, the Coffee Makers padded that margin to as large as 32 points, 78–46 in the third quarter, the closest Magnolia could get within was 17 points at 80–97. Ricardo Brown had a conference-high of 41 points for Great Taste while Norman Black of Magnolia was held down to his conference low of 21 points.

Game 6

The Coffee Makers unveiled its superiority and withstood the pressure, after being threatened twice in the game, Magnolia came back from an eight-point deficit in the third quarter to grab the upper hand, 70–68, the Ice Cream Makers last tasted the lead at 87–86, when Great Taste came up with a 9–0 blast to take a 95–87 advantage, another 10–3 run by the Coffee Makers stretched their lead to 105–90 as the sell-out crowd on hand smells victory for Great Taste.

Rosters

Broadcast notes

References

1985
1985 PBA season
San Miguel Beermen games
Great Taste Coffee Makers games
PBA Open Conference Finals